Stephen Wearne (born 4 October 1968) is a former Australian rules footballer who played for Melbourne in the Australian Football League (AFL) in 1992. Originally from Queensland, he was recruited from the Sandringham Football Club in the Victorian Football Association (VFA) with the 22nd selection in the 1991 Mid-year Draft.

He is the brother of David Wearne, who played for the Brisbane Bears.

References

External links

Living people
1968 births
Melbourne Football Club players
Sandringham Football Club players
Australian rules footballers from Queensland